Lagkadas Province was one of the two provinces of Thessaloniki Prefecture of Greece. Its territory corresponded with that of the current municipalities Lagkadas and Volvi. It was abolished in 2006.

References

Provinces of Greece